Acel  or variation, may refer to:

People
 Acél (surname)
 Ervin Acél (disambiguation)
 Acel Bisa (born 1976) aka Acel Van Ommen, Philippine singer-songwriter

Places
 al-Acel, Syria; a village involved in the Battle of Tabqa (2017)

Other uses
 Association of Luxembourg Student Unions (ACEL; founded 1984)
 Association of Christian Educators of Louisiana, an American football sports league, see List of Louisiana state high school football champions

See also

 Accell NV, Dutch bicycle company
 
 
 CEL (disambiguation)
 ACELL (disambiguation)
 Accel (disambiguation)
 Acei (disambiguation)
 Ace1 (disambiguation)